Doʻstlik is an urban-type settlement in Fergana Region, Uzbekistan. Administratively, it is part of the city Quvasoy. The town population in 1989 was 2111 people.

References

Populated places in Fergana Region
Urban-type settlements in Uzbekistan